is a puzzle-platform game developed by HAL Laboratory and published by Nintendo for the Nintendo 3DS handheld game console. The game was released in Japan in January 2016, and in other territories in June 2016. BoxBoxBoy! is a sequel to BoxBoy!, which was released in 2015.

Gameplay

Just like the previous game, BoxBoxBoy! once again has players controlling Qbby, a box-shaped character who can create boxes from out of his body. Like before, players use boxes to solve various puzzles, such as climbing on ledges, pushing switches, and avoiding obstacles, in order to reach the end of each level. This time around, Qbby is able to create two sets of boxes at a time, allowing for more complex puzzle solving. Players can use medals earned from completing levels to unlock costumes, music tracks, and 4-panel comic strips, and unlock additional levels by collecting crowns.

Reception

BoxBoxBoy! received positive reviews from critics. On Metacritic, the game holds a score of 80/100 based on 26 reviews. Chris Carter from Destructoid gave the game a score of 7.5/10, saying that it had a "simplistic elegance". Game Informer's Kyle Hilliard gave the game an 8/10, stating that it was "remarkably similar" to its predecessor and failed to expand on the original concept, but that these were not "bad things".

Notes

References

2016 video games
HAL Laboratory games
Nintendo 3DS games
Nintendo 3DS-only games
Puzzle-platform games
Single-player video games
Video games developed in Japan
BoxBoy!